St Helens Council, also known as St Helens Borough Council, and St Helens Metropolitan Borough Council, is the local authority of the Metropolitan Borough of St Helens in Merseyside. It is a metropolitan district council, one of five in Merseyside and one of 36 in the metropolitan counties of England, and provides the majority of local government services in St Helens. It is a constituent council of Liverpool City Region Combined Authority.

History
The current local authority was first elected in 1973, a year before formally coming into its powers and prior to the creation of the Metropolitan Borough of St Helens on 1 April 1974. The council, which already previously possessed borough status, then came to be known as St Helens Metropolitan Borough Council.

Political control

Since 1973, political control of the council has been held by the following parties:

References

Metropolitan district councils of England
Local authorities in Merseyside
Leader and cabinet executives
Local education authorities in England
Billing authorities in England
1974 establishments in England
Metropolitan Borough of St Helens